Tamarine Tanasugarn and Varatchaya Wongteanchai are the defending champions of the Women's Doubles competition of the 2011 Southeast Asian Games. Tanasugarn decided not to participate and Wongteanchai partnered with Nicha Lertpitaksinchai. Second seed Noppawan Lertcheewakarn and Nungnadda Wannasuk won the title by beating Wongteanchai and Lertpitaksinchai 6–3, 6–2 in the final.

Medalists

Draw

Seeds
All seeds received bye to the quarterfinals.

  Ayu-Fani Damayanti /  Jessy Rompies (semifinals)
  Noppawan Lertcheewakarn /  Nungnadda Wannasuk (champion)
  Lavinia Tananta /  Grace Sari Ysidora (quarterfinals)
  Nicha Lertpitaksinchai /  Varatchaya Wongteanchai (final)

Main draw

References
Draw
SEAG2011 Start/Result Lists - Tennis

Women's Doubles